RocksDB is a high performance embedded database for key-value data. It is a fork of Google's LevelDB optimized to exploit many CPU cores, and make efficient use of fast storage, such as solid-state drives (SSD), for input/output (I/O) bound workloads. It is based on a log-structured merge-tree (LSM tree) data structure. It is written in C++ and provides official language bindings for C++, C, and Java; alongside many third-party language bindings. RocksDB is open-source software, and was originally released under a BSD 3-clause license. However, in July 2017 the project was migrated to a dual license of both Apache 2.0 and GPLv2 license, possibly in response to the Apache Software Foundation's blacklist of the previous BSD+Patents license clause.

RocksDB is used in production systems at various web-scale enterprises including Facebook, Yahoo!, and LinkedIn.

Features 
RocksDB, like LevelDB, stores keys and values in arbitrary byte arrays, and data is sorted byte-wise by key or by providing a custom comparator.

RocksDB provides all of the features of LevelDB, plus:

 Transactions
 Backups and snapshots
 Column families
 Bloom filters
 Time to live (TTL) support
 Universal compaction
 Merge operators
 Statistics collection
 Geospatial indexing

and others: List of RocksDB features that are not in LevelDB.

RocksDB is not an SQL database (although MyRocks combines RocksDB with MySQL). Like other NoSQL and dbm stores, it has no relational data model, and it does not support SQL queries. Also, it has no direct support for secondary indexes, however a user may build their own internally using Column Families or externally. Applications use RocksDB as a library, as it does not provide a server or command-line interface.

History 
RocksDB was created at Facebook by Dhruba Borthakur in April 2012, as a fork of LevelDB with the initial stated goal of improving performance for server workloads.

Integration 
As an embeddable database, RocksDB can be used as a storage engine within a larger database management system (DBMS). For example, Rockset uses RocksDB mostly for analytical data processing.

Alternative backend 
The following projects have been started to replace or offer alternative storage engines for already-established database systems with RocksDB:

ArangoDB 
ArangoDB has added RocksDB to its previous storage engine ("mmfiles"). Starting with ArangoDB 3.4, RocksDB will be the default storage engine in ArangoDB.

Cassandra 
Cassandra on RocksDB can improve the performance of Apache Cassandra significantly (3-4 times faster in general, 100 times faster in some use-cases). The Instagram team at Facebook developed and open-sourced their code, along with benchmarks of their performance results.

MariaDB 
MariaDB can use the MyRocks storage engine (which is forked from RocksDB) since MariaDB 10.2.5 (Alpha status)  and stable since MariaDB 10.2.16 in 2018.

MongoDB 
The MongoRocks project provides a storage module for MongoDB where the storage engine is RocksDB.

A related program is Rocks Strata, a tool written in Go, which allows managing incremental backups of MongoDB when RocksDB is used as the storage engine.

MySQL 
The MyRocks project creates a new RocksDB-based storage engine for MySQL. In-depth details about MyRocks were presented at Percona Live 2016.

UKV 
The UKV project allows users to use RocksDB on par with LevelDB as the underlying Key-Value Store. It represents a shared abstraction for CRUD operations common to every storage engine. It augments it with structured bindings for several high-level languages, like Python, Java, and Go.

Embedded 
The following database systems and applications have chosen to use RocksDB as their embedded storage engine:

Ceph's BlueStore 
The Ceph's BlueStore storage layer uses RocksDB for metadata management in OSD devices.

Apache Flink 
Apache Flink uses RocksDB to store checkpoints.

FusionDB 
FusionDB uses RocksDB as its storage engine for XML, Key/Value, and JSON.

LogDevice LogsDB 
LogDevice's LogsDB is built atop RocksDB.

Manhattan 
The Manhattan Distributed Key-Value Store has used RocksDB as its primary engine to store Twitter data since 2018.

Rockset 
The Rockset service that is used for operational data analytics uses RocksDB as its storage engine.

SSDB 
The ssdb-rocks project uses RocksDB as the storage engine for the SSDB NoSQL Database.

TiDB 
The TiDB project uses RocksDB as its storage engine.

YugabyteDB 
The YugabyteDB database uses a modified version of RocksDB as part of its DocDB storage engine

Third-party language bindings 
Third-party programming language bindings available for RocksDB include:

 C
 C#
 Chicken Scheme
 D
 Elixir
 Erlang
 Go
 Haskell
 Java
 Node.js
 Objective-C, and Swift
 OCaml
 Perl
 PHP
 Prolog
 Python
 Ruby
 Rust

References

External links 
 

Bigtable implementations
NoSQL
Database engines
Embedded databases
C++ libraries
Facebook software
Key-value databases